The Peugeot Type 63 is an early motor car designed by Armand Peugeot and produced by the French auto-maker Peugeot at their Audincourt plant in 1904. 136 were produced, divided between shorter wheelbase Type 63As and longer wheelbase Type 63Bs.

The car was seen by some as a belated replacement for the company’s Type 36, intended as a mid-range car, but with more interior space than most competitor vehicles.

The Type 63 was propelled using a parallel twin cylinder 1,078 cc four stroke engine, mounted ahead of the driver.

Body types offered included an open carriage Tonneau format body, what would subsequently become known as a Torpedo body and a Coupé-Limousine which at that time was a body style resembling a small closed carriage but with an engine instead of horses.

Sources and further reading 
 Wolfgang Schmarbeck: Alle Peugeot Automobile 1890-1990. Motorbuch-Verlag. Stuttgart 1990. 

Type 63
Cars introduced in 1904
Veteran vehicles